"Molly's Chambers" is the second single taken from Youth and Young Manhood, the debut album by the American alternative rock band Kings of Leon.

This song has an alternate take known as "Molly's Hangover", however this version is slower until towards the end. It also features a different style of back-up vocals and different guitar solo(s).

Composition
The title is taken from a line in Thin Lizzy's version of the traditional Irish folk song "Whiskey in the Jar". "Molly's chambers" is archaic slang for a brothel.

Track listing

CD Digipack
"Molly's Chambers"
"Wasted Time"
"Spiral Staircase"

CD single
"Molly's Chambers"
"Molly's Hangover"
"Red Morning Light"

10" vinyl
Limited edition 6,000 copies.

"Molly's Chambers" – 2:15
"Holy Roller Novocaine" (Live at the Birmingham Academy June 27, 2003) – 3:50

Charts

Certifications

References

External links
10" vinyl information – Discogs.com reference page.

Kings of Leon songs
American songs
2003 singles